Dhaulana Assembly constituency is one of the 403 constituencies of the Uttar Pradesh Legislative Assembly, India. It is a part of the Ghaziabad district and one of the five assembly constituencies in the Ghaziabad Lok Sabha constituency. First election in this assembly constituency was held in 2012 after the "Delimitation of Parliamentary and Assembly Constituencies Order, 2008" was passed and the constituency was formed in 2008. The constituency is assigned identification number 58.

Wards / Areas
Extent of Dhaulana Assembly constituency is KC Dhaulana, Shaulana, Dhikri, Karanpur, Kakrana, Naraynanpur, Sapnawat, PCs Girdharpur Tumrail, Sabli, Raghunathpur, Baroda Hinduwan, Anwarpur, Dadri, Badnauli, Sarawa of Hapur KC & Pilkhuwa MB of Hapur Tehsil; Ghaziabad KC (excluding PCs Duhi, Ataur, Shamsher, Sardarpur & Bahadurpur) and Dasna NP of Ghaziabad Tehsil.

Members of the Legislative Assembly

Election results

2022

17th Vidhan Sabha: 2017 General  Elections

16th Vidhan Sabha: 2012 General Elections.

See also
Ghaziabad district, India
Ghaziabad Lok Sabha constituency
Sixteenth Legislative Assembly of Uttar Pradesh
Uttar Pradesh Legislative Assembly

References

External links
 

Assembly constituencies of Uttar Pradesh
Ghaziabad district, India
Constituencies established in 2008
2008 establishments in Uttar Pradesh